Juanita's Cafe and Bar (often just Juanita's) was a well-known venue and restaurant in Little Rock, Arkansas.

Juanita's closed Dec 20, 2015.

Notable performers 
Acts who have performed live there have include:

Andy McKee
Avenged Sevenfold
Black Stone Cherry
Buckcherry
Buckethead
Chupacabra
Envy On The Coast
Eric Johnson
Evanescence
Fear Factory
Forgive Durden
Hana Pestle
Hellyeah
Machina (band)
Mushroomhead
OK Go
Powerman 5000
Saosin
Socialburn
Sparta
The Outline
VAST
We Are The Fallen
Your Enemies Friends
 Zakk Wylde

References

External links
 AA Nightlife
 

Restaurants in Arkansas
Music venues in Arkansas
Buildings and structures in Little Rock, Arkansas
Tourist attractions in Little Rock, Arkansas